Jeffrey Matthew Ogden (born February 22, 1975) is a former American football wide receiver, kickoff and punt returner in the National Football League for the Dallas Cowboys, Miami Dolphins and Baltimore Ravens. He played college football at Eastern Washington University.

Early years
Ogden was born with a problem in his foot that led specialists to believe that he would have a permanent limp. He eventually overcame the physical problem and turned into a top-ranked youth gymnast.

He attended Snohomish High School, where he played as wide receiver, quarterback, running back and defensive back in American football. He also lettered in track and basketball.

College career
Following one year spent as a pole vaulter at Clackamas Community College, he walked-on at Eastern Washington University. As a freshman, he appeared in 4 games, collecting one reception for 4 yards. As a sophomore, he suffered a season-ending back injury after starting the first three games, finishing with 2 receptions for 36 yards. As a junior, he appeared in 10 games, making 10 receptions for 216 yards.

Although he only had 13 receptions going into his senior year, he would start 14 games at wide receiver for the 1997 football team that compiled a 12-2 record, won the Big Sky Conference title and advanced to the semifinals of the Division I-AA playoffs. He led the team with 57 receptions for 1,148 yards (school record) and 13 receiving touchdown]s (tied school record). He also practiced gymnastics.

Professional career

Dallas Cowboys
Ogden was signed as an undrafted free agent by the Dallas Cowboys after the 1998 NFL Draft. He had some notable preseason performances, but never developed into a consistent wide receiver. In the regular season, he usually was the team's fifth receiver and played mostly on special teams, making 10 tackles (tied for sixth on the team). In 1999, he returned 12 kickoffs for a 21-yard average and made five special teams tackles.

In 2000, he was allocated to the Rhein Fire of NFL Europe, where he ranked fifth in the league with 44 receptions for 635 yards, despite missing the last two games with a sprained right foot. He also had 7 touchdowns, while helping the team finish with the league's best record (7-3) and  winning World Bowl 2000. He returned to the Cowboys with a sprained foot and later injured the left one, which caused him to miss most of training camp. On August 22, he was traded to the Miami Dolphins in exchange for a seventh round draft choice, which the team later used to select Pete Hunter.

Miami Dolphins
In 2000, he reunited with offensive coordinator Chan Gailey, who was his head coach with the Dallas Cowboys and also found a niche as a returner. Against the Green Bay Packers, he returned a punt for an 81-yard touchdown, the third-longest punt return in team history. He also finished the season with a league leading and franchise single-season record 17-yard punt return average. In 2001, his 11.8-yard punt return average ranked eighth in the NFL.

On September 1, 2002, he was waived after being passed on the depth chart by Albert Johnson. He left as the Dolphins' all-time team leader in punt return average (13.7-yard) and third all-time in punt return yards (700 yards).

Baltimore Ravens
On September 10, 2002, he was signed as a free agent by the Baltimore Ravens to play on special teams. He appeared in 3 games and was declared inactive in 10, while sharing punt return duties with Chris McAlister. He wasn't re-signed at the end of the season.

Ogden's most productive season as a wide receiver was in 1999, when he caught 12 passes for 144 yards in 10 games. He caught his only touchdown reception in 2001. He ended his professional career playing in 67 games, registering 28 receptions for 304 yards and one touchdown.

Personal life
He owns a fitness club. He was an assistant coach in NFL Europe and at Duquesne University. Ogden appeared in seasons 7 and 8 of the Bravo show The Millionaire Matchmaker, where he sought a date.

References

1975 births
Living people
People from Snohomish, Washington
Players of American football from Washington (state)
American football return specialists
American football wide receivers
Eastern Washington Eagles football players
Dallas Cowboys players
Rhein Fire players
Miami Dolphins players
Baltimore Ravens players
Duquesne Dukes football coaches